An election to the United States House of Representatives was held in Pennsylvania on October 9, 1792, for the 3rd Congress.

Background
Eight representatives, 4 Pro-Administration and 4 Anti-Administration, had been elected in the previous election.  In the previous election, Pennsylvania had been divided into 8 districts.  Five additional seats had been apportioned to Pennsylvania after the 1790 Census.  All 13 seats were elected at-large, an attempt by the Pro-Administration-majority legislature of Pennsylvania to prevent the election of Anti-Administration Representatives.  This backfired and an 8-5 Anti-Administration majority was elected.

Election results
All 8 incumbents ran for re-election.  Seven were re-elected.  There were a total of 20 candidates running for the 13 seats, 11 Anti-Administration and 9 Pro-Administration (two of the Anti-Administration candidates ran on a dual ticket but are listed here as Anti-Administration)

This was the last year in which Pennsylvania would elect all of its representatives at-large.  In the following election, Pennsylvania would be divided up into 12 districts (including one plural district).  At various times between 1873 and 1945, between 1 and 4 of Pennsylvania's Representatives were elected at-large, with the rest being elected from single-member districts.

References
Electoral data and information on districts are from the Wilkes University Elections Statistics Project

1792
Pennsylvania
United States House of Representatives